Typophaula melancholica is a species of beetle in the family Cerambycidae, and the only species in the genus Typophaula. It was described by Thomson in 1868.

References

Apomecynini
Beetles described in 1868
Monotypic beetle genera